Summing (April 16, 1978 – October 10, 2008) was an American thoroughbred racehorse and sire.

Background
Summing was a bay horse bred in Kentucky by his owner Charles T. Wilson Jr. He was sired by Verbatim, a leading dirt performer whose wins included the 1969 Whitney Stakes. The best of his other progeny included  Alphabatim and Princess Rooney. Summing's dam Sumatra was a high-class racemare whose wins included a division of the Santa Ysabel Stakes.

Racing career
Until the detection of a blood infection, Summing performed so poorly that he was dropped from graded stakes races and entered in an allowance race.  Once the infection was found, he was unable to compete in the Kentucky Derby and the Preakness Stakes, although two weeks before the Belmont he was well enough to win the Pennsylvania Derby.

Trained by Luis Barrera, brother of American Hall of Fame thoroughbred racehorse trainer Laz Barrera, Summing is best known for his upset over U.S. Champion 3-Yr-Old Colt Pleasant Colony in the Belmont Stakes with George Martens aboard.  He won the race in a time of 2:29, spoiling Pleasant Colony's bid for the Triple Crown, as Pleasant Colony ran wide in the turn and placed third, behind Highland Blade.

In the fall, Summing won the Pegasus Stakes, then finished second in the Super Derby.

Stud record
Summing was retired to Jonabell Farm, where he stood at stud until from 1982 to 1991.  He was then sent to Getaway Farm in California. Summing was pensioned from study duties in September 2003 due to declining fertility and stood at the farm until he died in his sleep of natural causes at 30 years old in October, 2008.

His graded stakes race progeny include Epitome, Summer Matinee, and Matthews Keep.

Pedigree

Summing was inbred 4 × 4 to Nasrullah, meaning that this stallion appears twice in the fourth generation of his pedigree.

References

1978 racehorse births
2008 racehorse deaths
Racehorses bred in Kentucky
Racehorses trained in the United States
Belmont Stakes winners
Thoroughbred family 1-g